Trouble is a five-issue romance comic book limited series published in 2003 by Marvel Comics as a part of its Epic Comics imprint. Written by Mark Millar and illustrated by Terry and Rachel Dodson, the series deals with teen pregnancy. The basic concept was created by Bill Jemas and Joe Quesada.

Trouble was considered by Marvel's editorial group as the origin of the Ultimate Marvel Spider-Man.  It was also meant to re-popularize romance comics (which were very popular in the 1950s, selling millions of copies), but failed.

A trade paperback collecting the five issues was originally scheduled to be published on 18 February 2004, but canceled when Epic was shut down after Bill Jemas, who had been a driving force behind the imprint, resigned as president of Marvel Comics. A hardcover collection was published by Marvel on June 1, 2011.

Characters
 May Reilly – A 17-year-old redhead and something of a wild child.
 Mary Fitzpatrick – May's blonde best friend and rather shy.
 Ben Parker – Richard's older brother, who was often in hospitals as a child.
 Richard (Richie) Parker – Ben's younger brother and their dad's clear favorite.

Plot summary
May and her best friend Mary work in a resort in the Hamptons during their summer vacation, looking for some fun away from home. Soon they make friends with fellow service staff members Richard and his brother Ben, and the four of them begin hanging out. After a couple of days of hard work and being bossed about by the guests, May and Mary go to a dance together. After the dance and a round of night swimming, they head back to their rooms; May takes Ben to her room and sleeps with him, while Mary tells Richie it is too fast for her, and she wants to wait before having sex with him. She later reveals to him it is because a palm-reader told her she would become a mom before she was twenty if she had sex in her teens. The same fortune-teller also told May nobody was ever going to call her "mom", which explains why May is so open in her relationships. Richie is not very understanding of her reasons for not sleeping with him, and starts an affair with May. May tells Mary she is cheating on Ben, but not with whom. A while later, she finds out that she is pregnant. Upon realizing the fortune-teller must have been wrong, Mary now finally sleeps with Richie, who then ends the affair with May. When May reveals her pregnancy to Ben, it turns out he's sterile and her affair with Richie, who must be the father, is uncovered. May is thinking about having an abortion, but decides against it. Afraid of going home and facing her dad with an unwanted child, May runs away.

May finds a man to stay with, but does not tell him about her pregnancy. She grows to be disgusted by him. May contacts Mary and meets with her. Mary is still very angry with May for having an affair with Richie, and tells her she deserves all the trouble she is going through, but decides to help her when May tells her she has been thinking about suicide. Mary comes up with the plan to tell everybody the baby is hers, so May will not have to face her fundamentalist parents and Mary can test if she can trust Richie, who is still in love with her and writing her frequent letters, none of which she has answered yet. Once May gives birth to her healthy baby boy, Peter, Mary takes him to Richie, and they start a family, while May returns home to her parents as if nothing had happened.

Covers
All issues of Trouble featured photo covers by French photographer Philippe Bialobos in the style of teen romance novels, which is unusual for an American comic book series, with cover design by Joe Quesada. These covers were to appeal to a female audience (Marvel originally hoped for high sales outside the comic scene, particularly with a collected edition that was to be heavily promoted in many bookstores, but never published after the series did not do well in the direct market).

The second printing of the first issue (Trouble #1: The Second Chances Edition) was the only one to feature a conventional comic book cover, drawn by Frank Cho.

Reception
The reveal that series' main characters, May, Ben, Mary and Richard, are meant to be Peter Parker's Aunt May and Uncle Ben, and his parents Richard and Mary Parker, and thus, the revelation that the Ultimate Marvel incarnation of Aunt May is actually Peter Parker's biological mother was seen as highly controversial among Spider-Man fans, with many criticisms of the series mistakenly implying the series to be set in Marvel's primary continuity, with Millar's dialogue being criticized as not being representative of the time it is set in (supposedly the 1970s) and his storytelling failing to grab the audience; many complained that the characters were written too similarly, and were hard to keep apart, "save for the fact that one of the girls will do it on the first date when the other one won't". In contrast, Dodson's artwork throughout the series was praised.

References

External links
Trouble cover gallery at Comic Book DB
Newsarama'''s coverage of Marvel's press conference about Trouble'' (archived at archive.org)

SpiderFan.org Top Ten Reasons Not To Take The Trouble Mini-series Seriously

2003 comics debuts
Epic Comics titles
Marvel Comics limited series
Romance comics